The Mosque of Sayyid Ar-Mahmoud is a former Shia Islamic mosque and shrine complex that was located in Tal Afar, Iraq. The complex was founded in 1998 and destroyed in 2014.

The mausoleum 

The mausoleum of Sayyid Ar-Mahmoud is located under the green dome of the mosque.

Destruction 
The mausoleum was destroyed by ISIL in 2014 as part of a plan to destroy historic shrines in Tal Afar, Mosul and Nineveh. Explosives were planted at the tomb, completely destroying the green dome as well as the shrine under it and damaged several graves in the cemetery next to the shrine.

See also

 Islam in Iraq
 List of mosques in Iraq

References 

Mosques in Iraq
2014 disestablishments in Iraq